General elections were held in India in 1989 to elect the members of the 9th Lok Sabha. The incumbent Indian National Congress (I) government under the premiership of Rajiv Gandhi was defeated by the National Front, an alliance forged by Janata Dal, which won a plurality of seats. The alliance formed the government with outside support from Bharatiya Janata Party (BJP). V. P. Singh was sworn in as the seventh Prime Minister of India on 2 December 1989.

BJP wins 12 seats, Janata Dal wins 11 and Congress wins 3 seats out of a total of 26 seats.

Party-wise results summary

Results- Constituency wise

References

Indian general elections in Gujarat
Gujarat
1980s in Gujarat